The Piala Presiden is a developmental football competition in Malaysia for Under-21 players. The cup consists of developmental squad from clubs competing in the top and second division of Malaysian football league system, the Malaysia Super League and the Malaysia Premier League. The cup exists alongside the youth competition for Under-19 players, the Piala Belia.

History 
Since its inception in 1985, Piala Presiden has been the major tournament for Under-21 and Under-23 players. The format for the tournament has seen a lot of changes as in 2009 the format of the competition was changed with only Under-20 players eligible to be fielded for the tournament. In 2015, the format of the competition was reverted to the original format with Under-21 players and three overage players eligible to play.

In 2016, the tournament format was also changed with the competing clubs divided into two groups and played a round-robin leg with four top clubs from each group at the end of the season qualifying for the playoff round to determine the champion. The final match for the cup is broadcast by Astro Arena.

Logo evolution 
Since the inception of the competition in 1985, numerous logos have been introduced to reflect the sponsorship. For the 2017 season a new logo was unveiled.

Champions

Team records

See also 
 FAM Football Awards

References

External links 
 

President